Eenam is a 1983 Indian Malayalam film, directed by Bharathan and produced by M. O. Joseph. The film stars Venu Nagavally, Shanthi Krishna, Adoor Bhasi and Bharath Gopi in the lead roles. The film has musical score by Ouseppachan and original songs composed by director Bharathan himself.

Cast
Venu Nagavally
Shanthi Krishna
Adoor Bhasi
Bharath Gopi
Unnimary
Sreenath

Soundtrack
The original songs featured in the film were composed by Bharathan and the lyrics were written by Venu Nagavally and Bharathan. Ouseppachan composed the background score of the film, thus making his debut as a film composer.

References

External links
 

1983 films
1980s Malayalam-language films
Films scored by Bharathan
Films directed by Bharathan